The 2014 La Route de France was an Elite Women's road  race, rated at 2.1 by the UCI. Claudia Lichtenberg of  won the first stage by 29 seconds and held on to the leader's jersey for the entire race.

Teams
The following teams are participating:
UCI Women's Teams

 Alé–Cipollini
 Astana BePink
 Lointek
 Lotto–Belisol Ladies
 Poitou–Charentes.Futuroscope.86
 RusVelo
 Team Giant–Shimano
 Vaiano Fondriest
 Wiggle–Honda

National teams

 Australia
 France
 Lithuania
 Netherlands
 Slovakia

Stages
The 2014 edition of the race has seven road race stages, with no prologue or time trial stages.

Stage 1
10 August 2014 – Mouilleron-en-Pareds to Mouilleron-en-Pareds,

Stage 2
11 August 2014 – Mouilleron-en-Pareds to Ligné,

Stage 3
12 August 2014 – Château-du-Loir to Vendôme,

Stage 4
13 August 2014 – Cloyes-sur-le-Loir to Chalette-sur-Loing,

Stage 5
14 August 2014 – Paucourt to Migennes,

Stage 6
15 August 2014 – Pougues-les-Eaux to Varennes-sur-Allier,

Stage 7
16 August 2014 – Marcigny to Marcigny,

Classification leadership

References

External links

La Route de France
2014 in women's road cycling
2014 in French sport